Ignatius Andrew Muich (November 23, 1903 – July 2, 1993) is a former Major League Baseball pitcher. He played one season with the Boston Braves in 1924.

References

External links

Boston Braves players
1903 births
1993 deaths
Baseball players from St. Louis
Major League Baseball pitchers
Dover Senators players
Worcester Panthers players